The Kivu long-haired shrew (Crocidura lanosa) is a species of mammal in the family Soricidae. It is found in the Democratic Republic of the Congo and Rwanda. Its natural habitats are subtropical or tropical moist montane forests and swamps.

Sources
 Hutterer, R. & Dieterlen, F. 2004.  Crocidura lanosa.   2006 IUCN Red List of Threatened Species.   Downloaded on 30 July 2007.

Crocidura
Mammals described in 1968
Taxonomy articles created by Polbot
Taxa named by Henri Heim de Balsac